The 2023 World Para Nordic Skiing Championships was held from 21 to 29 January 2023 in Östersund, Sweden. Originally scheduled to take place in the Swedish region of Jämtland and include nordic, alpine and snowboard competitions following the successful inaugural edition of the 2021 Combined Snow Sports World Championships in Lillehammer.

Schedule

Medalists

Para Biathlon

Para Cross-Country

Medal table

References

External links
Official website
FIS Para Cross-Country
FIS Para Biathlon

Biathlon competitions in Sweden
January 2023 sports events in Sweden
Sports competitions in Östersund